CFES Brilliant Pathways (CFES) is a nonprofit organization that raises the academic aspirations and performance of low-income youth so that they can prepare for, gain access to, and succeed in college.

Founded in 1991, the organization has helped more than 100,000 underserved youth in urban and rural schools throughout the United States get to and through college. Targeted students, known as CFES Scholars, are low-income youth, most of whom would be first in their family to pursue higher education. In the last eight years, 95 percent of the CFES Scholars in grade 12 have gone on to college.

Each participating school selects more than 50 CFES Scholars to engage in three core practices that research has shown are effective in helping underserved students take steps toward college success:  Pathways to College, Mentoring, and the Essential Skills.

CFES Brilliant Pathways is based in Essex, New York.

References

Press coverage

External links

Educational organizations based in the United States